Grassy Hill is the fourteenth highest mountain in Hong Kong. Peaked at 647 m (2,123 ft), it is situated between Tsuen Wan and Tai Po and near Lead Mine Pass. Stage 7 of MacLehose Trail runs near its peak.

The summit of the hill is located near point of contact of Tai Po District, Tsuen Wan District and Sha Tin District. The summit itself is located within Tsuen Wan District.

See also 
 List of mountains, peaks and hills in Hong Kong
 Lead Mine Pass
 Wong Chuk Yeung (Sha Tin District)

References 

Mountains, peaks and hills of Hong Kong
Shing Mun
Sha Tin District
Tai Po District
Tsuen Wan District